This discography is of the albums and singles released by American R&B/soul singer Al Green.

Albums

Studio albums

 Album credited to Al Greene.

Live albums
Tokyo...Live! (1978 [1981], Hi) 2-LP

Compilation albums

Singles

 Single credited to Al Greene & the Soul Mates.
 Single credited to Al Greene.

Movie/television soundtracks
"A Change Is Gonna Come" appears in the film Ali. The original was written and sung by Sam Cooke, however Green recorded a live version for the film which is played when Muhammad Ali - played by Will Smith - learns of the death of close friend Malcolm X.
"Here I Am" was featured in the movie, The Hitchhiker's Guide to the Galaxy.
"How Can You Mend a Broken Heart" was featured in the movies, Notting Hill, Good Will Hunting, Sex and the City, The Virgin Suicides and The Book of Eli, as well as the television series, Ally McBeal.
"Let's Stay Together" was used in the soundtrack of the movies, Pulp Fiction (1994), Love Don't Cost a Thing (2003), and Hellboy (2005).
"Love Is a Beautiful Thing" was featured in the movies, The Pallbearer (1996), Legally Blonde (2001), Sorority Boys (2002) and Two Weeks Notice (2002).
"Tired of Being Alone" was featured in the movies, Dead Presidents (1995) and Love Don't Cost a Thing (2003).
"Love and Happiness" has been featured in several different movies: Menace II Society (1993), Dead Presidents (1995), Love and Basketball (2000), Gunmen (1994) and Madea's Family Reunion (2006) as well as television series: House M.D. ("Clueless"; season 2, episode 15) and Fringe ("Inner Child"; season 1, episode 15).

Other
In 2009, Al Green, along with Heather Headley, released a version of the song "People Get Ready" on the compilation album, Oh Happy Day.

In 2011, Time Life released his March 3, 1973 Soul Train performance of "Love and Happiness" on The Best of Soul Train Live.

References

External links

Rhythm and blues discographies
Discographies of American artists
Soul music discographies
Discography